The 2022–23 season is the eighteen season in RoundGlass Punjab FC's existence, and their seventh consecutive season in I-League. This season of the I-League witnesses the return of the home-away format of the matches similar to that of the 2019–20 I-League season after a break of two years due to the COVID-19 pandemic in the country.

With a 4–0 away win over Rajasthan United on 4 March 2023, RoundGlass Punjab became the first club to secure promotion to the Indian Super League, from the I-League. On the same day, RoundGlass Punjab were confirmed as champions. RoundGlass Punjab finished with 52 points from 22 matches, becoming the first champion side to cross the 50-point mark since Churchill Brothers in 2012–13.

Managerial changes 
During pre-season, it was announced that Ed Engelkes would leave as role as interim first team manager and replaced on 8 August 2022 by Staikos Vergetis. The club later announced Ed Engelkes would return to his role as Technical Director of Youth Affairs.

Personnel

Current technical staff

Transfers

In

Out

Competition

Overview

I-League

League table

League Results by Round

Matches 
Note: I-League announced the fixtures for the 2022–23 season on 1 November 2022.

Super Cup 

RoundGlass Punjab were drawn in the Group A for the 3rd edition of the Super Cup along with two ISL clubs and one I-League club.

Group stage

Matches

Statistics 
All stats are correct as of 12 March 2023

Squad appearances and goals

I-League 

|-
!colspan=16 style="background:#FD6019; color:#FFFFFF;"| Goalkeepers

|-
!colspan=16 style="background:#FD6019; color:#FFFFFF;"| Defenders

|-
!colspan=16 style="background:#FD6019; color:#FFFFFF;"| Midfielders

|-
!colspan=16 style="background:#FD6019; color:#FFFFFF;"| Forwards

|-
!colspan=16 style="background:#FD6019; color:#FFFFFF;"|Players who have made an appearance or had a squad number this season but have left the club

|}

Clean-sheets

References 

Minerva Punjab F.C.
RoundGlass Punjab FC seasons